, son of regent Kujō Hisatada and adopted son of his brother, Kujō Yukitsune, was a kuge or Japanese court noble of the late Edo period and politician of the early Meiji era who served as a member of the House of Peers. One of his daughters, Sadako married Emperor Taishō.
He was the maternal grandfather of Emperor Showa.

In the bakumatsu period, Kujō supported the Shogunate policy as one of highest courtier of the imperial court and hence lost the power at the very beginning of Meiji restoration when the annihilation of the Shogunate was announced on 1868-01-03. His right to show at the imperial court was halted. Soon later in the same year he was rehabilitated and  appointed of the clan master of Fujiwara clan.

During the Boshin War, he had nominal leadership of the imperial army's Northern Pacification Command (奥羽鎮撫総督府), and spent the latter part of the war in northern Japan.

He was elevated to princedom in 1869 as the family head of Kujō family, when the Meiji government founded Kazoku peerage system.

Family
Father: Kujō Hisatada
Mother: Karahashi Meiko (1796–1881)
Foster Father: Kujō Yukitsune (1823–1859)
Wife: Sō Kazuko
Concubine: Noma Ikuko
Children:
Kujo Michizane (1870–1933)
Noriko (1878–1901) married Prince Yamashina Kikumaro by Ikuko
Kujo Sekiyuki
Kazuko (1882–1911) married Otani Kozui
Empress Teimei married Emperor Taishō by Ikuko
Ryuko married Shibutani Ryukyo
Kinuko married Otani Koaki

Ancestry

References

 

1839 births
1906 deaths
Fujiwara clan
Kujō family
People of the Boshin War
Meiji Restoration